Stan Horne (born 17 December 1944) is an English former professional footballer who played as a midfielder. Horne was the first black player in the history of two of his teams - Manchester City and Fulham and the second to play for Aston Villa. He also played for Chester, Denver Dynamos and Rochdale, making a total of 201 appearances in the Football League. He was forced to retire from professional football due to high blood pressure.

Honours

Manchester City
First Division: 1967–68

References

1944 births
Living people
English footballers
English expatriate footballers
Aston Villa F.C. players
Manchester City F.C. players
Fulham F.C. players
Chester City F.C. players
Denver Dynamos players
Rochdale A.F.C. players
English Football League players
North American Soccer League (1968–1984) players
Association football midfielders
Expatriate soccer players in the United States
English expatriate sportspeople in the United States